Wilson Bay is a waterway in Kivalliq Region, Nunavut, Canada. It is located in northwestern Hudson Bay, west of Whale Bay and north of Mistake Bay. It has numerous shoals, some of which are dry.

References

Bays of Kivalliq Region